George Clive may refer to:

George Clive (died 1779), MP for Bishop's Castle
George Clive (Liberal politician) (1805–1880), politician, grandson of the above
George Sidney Clive (1874–1959), soldier, Marshal of the Diplomatic Corps, grandson of the above

See also
George Windsor-Clive (disambiguation)